C. Balakrishnan may refer to:
 C. Balakrishnan (plastic surgeon) (1918–1997), Indian plastic surgeon
 C. Balakrishnan (mountaineer) (died 2007), Indian mountaineer

See also
 C. V. Balakrishnan (born 1952), Indian writer of Malayalam literature
 C. N. Balakrishnan (1934–2018), Indian politician